Radka Toneff Memorial Award (established in 1993) is a Norwegian award given to individuals who are acting in the spirit of Norwegian jazz singer Radka Toneff.

The award amounts to 25,000 Norwegian kroner, and is managed by the Radka Toneff Memorial Fund with royalty income from her two releases Fairytales (1982) and Live in Hamburg (1993) on the label Odin Records.

The ceremony took place at Moldejazz until 2007.

Past recipients 

 1993 Sidsel Endresen
 1997 Kirsten Bråten Berg
 1999 Karin Krog
 2001 Per Jørgensen
 2003 Live Maria Roggen
 2005 Solveig Slettahjell 
 2007 Arve Henriksen
 2009 Elin Rosseland
 2011 Eldbjørg Raknes
 2013 Hanne Hukkelberg
 2015 Susanna Wallumrød
 2017 Kirsti Huke

See also
 List of music awards

References

1993 establishments in Norway
Awards established in 1993
Culture in Møre og Romsdal
Jazz awards
Norwegian jazz
Norwegian music awards